Liceo Particular Cardenal Raúl Silva Henríquez is a Chilean high school located in Nancagua, Colchagua Province, Chile.

References 

Educational institutions with year of establishment missing
Secondary schools in Chile
Schools in Colchagua Province